USS G-4 (SS-26) was a G-class submarine of the United States Navy. While the four G-boats were nominally all of a class, they differed enough in significant details that they are sometimes considered to be four unique boats, each in a class by herself.

G-4 was named Thrasher when her keel was laid down on 9 July 1910 by William Cramp & Sons in Philadelphia, making her the first ship of the United States Navy to be named for the thrasher, a thrushlike bird known as a singer and mimic. She was renamed G-4 on 17 November 1911, launched on 15 August 1912 sponsored by Ms. Grace Anna Taussig, and commissioned in the Philadelphia Navy Yard on 22 January 1914.

Service history
After fitting out, G-4 proceeded to the New York Navy Yard on 25 April for service with Division Three, Submarine Flotilla, Atlantic Fleet. Based on plans purchased from Italian designer Cesare Laurenti, G-4 was an even keel boat, meaning the round pressure hull was flat on the bottom. When surrounded by a streamlined outer hull, the boat was theoretically more stable than the earlier Holland-type boats. The different equipment and operating procedures meant G-4 spent the next five months conducting trial runs and diving tests, many of which failed owing to engine machinery breakdown. Still, almost all of her preliminary trials were completed by the end of August,  and the boat was conditionally accepted by the Navy on 21 September.

At the end of October, the boat shifted to New London, Connecticut, and from there she sailed on to Newport, Rhode Island in mid-November. Moving back to New York on 22 November, G-4 received post-shakedown repairs to her engines, which suffered from sea water damage owing to leaky exhaust lines and salt contamination of the oil system. After failing several engine trials that winter, the boat proceeded south to her builder's yard in Philadelphia on 9 March 1915. Following two months of repairs, G-4 departed Philadelphia on 12 May and sailed to New York for a Naval Review before President of the United States Woodrow Wilson. G-4 then conducted maneuvers with the submarine flotilla off Newport in late May and again in October, in addition to local training operations out of New York and the submarine base in New London.

On 14 January 1916, G-4 commenced a planned three-month overhaul at the New York Naval Shipyard. Workers installed a gyrocompass and repaired equipment in preparation for final acceptance trials on 7 March. Although successfully put through her paces, the boat returned to the yard for further alterations, including the installation of new diving rudders. Trouble with the Sperry gyrocompass rudder control mechanism — as well as continued modifications to engines and other machinery — kept the boat in the New York Navy Yard through the end of the year. Finally tested at sea in February 1917, the gyro stabilizer and diving rudders then failed in heavy weather. After G-4 returned to the yard, the broken rudders were repaired and the stabilizer mechanism removed by 10 March.

Sailing to New London on 24 April, G-4 was attached to Division Three, Submarine Flotilla. For the next year, she combined experimental work with new sound detection devices with training new student crews in submarine operations and torpedo firing, a period of time punctuated by her joining the submarine tender  for harbor submarine net defense experiments. In late July, she conducted battle exercises and submerged attack drills against SC-6. On 22 October, Thetis experimented with sound and magnetic detectors while G-4 lay on the bottom of Long Island Sound. Over the winter, she conducted numerous sound experiments with the newly established Submarine School in the area of Block Island Sound and Long Island Sound.

The submarine also conducted practice approaches and torpedo instruction for officer and enlisted submarine students. On 21 May, G-4 commenced test firing the new Mark VII torpedo for installation in O and N-class submarines, evolutions that lasted through mid-July. The boat then returned to New London for a yard period, undergoing motor and electrical repairs through October. Although G-4 resumed training and instruction duties on 4 November, the boat was slated for inactivation on 24 February 1919.

G-4 continued her training and experimental duties until 1 March, when she was placed in ordinary for stripping and inactivation. She decommissioned on 5 September, was designated as a target for depth charge and ordnance tests on 6 December, and was sold for scrapping to Connecticut Iron and Metal Company of New London on 15 April 1920. She was struck from the Naval Vessel Register on 13 August 1921.

References

Bibliography

External links
 

United States G-class submarines
World War I submarines of the United States
Ships built by William Cramp & Sons
1912 ships